The 2011 Magyar Kupa, known as ( for sponsorship reasons), is the 85th edition of the tournament.

Quarter-finals

Quarter-final matches were played on 4 and 5 November 2011.

|}

Final four

The final four will be held on 12 and 13 November 2011 at the Szőnyi úti uszoda in Budapest.

Semi-finals

Final

See also
 2011–12 Országos Bajnokság I

External links
 Hungarian Water Polo Federaration 

Seasons in Hungarian water polo competitions
Hungary
Magyar Kupa